Andrey Golubev was the defending champion, but decided not to participate.

Horacio Zeballos won the title, defeating Thiemo de Bakker in the final, 3–6, 6–3, 6–3.

Seeds

Draw

Finals

Top half

Bottom half

References
 Main Draw
 Qualifying Draw

Marburg Openandnbsp;- Singles
2014 Singles